The 1967 New York Jets season was the eighth season for the team in the American Football League (AFL). The season began with the team trying to improve on their 6–6–2 record from 1966 under head coach Weeb Ewbank. The Jets finished with an 8–5–1 record (their first winning season). 3rd year quarterback Joe Namath had the best season of his career becoming the first quarterback in pro football history to throw for 4,000 yards in a season (he threw for 4,007 yards). In addition, Namath also posted career highs in touchdown passes (26) and interceptions (28).

Roster

Schedule

Game summaries

Week 16

Standings

External links
1967 team stats

New York Jets seasons
New York Jets
New York Jets
1960s in Queens